Rincon Point, is a cape in Nueces County, Texas.  It lies north of Corpus Christi, Texas between Nueces Bay and Corpus Christi Bay.

References

Landforms of Nueces County, Texas